Hellen Cherono Koskei (born 22 February 1984) is a former Kenyan long-distance runner. She won a silver medal in the marathon event at the 2006 Commonwealth Games in Melbourne.

References

1984 births
Living people
20th-century Kenyan women
21st-century Kenyan women
Athletes (track and field) at the 2006 Commonwealth Games
Kenyan female long-distance runners
Commonwealth Games silver medallists for Kenya
Commonwealth Games medallists in athletics
Medallists at the 2006 Commonwealth Games